James Herschel Kirby (May 5, 1923 – July 17, 2009) was a pinch-hitter in Major League Baseball who played for the Chicago Cubs during the  season. He was born in Nashville, Tennessee.

Kirby began his career in the minor leagues in 1942, but missed the next three years due to military service. Returning to baseball action in 1946 he played until 1958, compiling 13 years of Post-World War II, including another nine and a half seasons after being drafted by the Cubs in the 1948 rule 5 draft.

In three major league games, Kirby had one hit in two at-bats for a .500 career batting average.

Kirby died in his home town of Nashville, Tennessee, at the age of 86.

External links

Baseball Almanac

Chicago Cubs players
United States Army personnel of World War II
Baseball players from Nashville, Tennessee
1923 births
2009 deaths
Nashville Vols players
Allentown Red Sox players
Augusta Rams players
Bluefield Blue-Grays players
Burials in Tennessee
Cordele Reds players
Dallas Eagles players
Gainesville Owls players
Landis Senators players
Paris Indians players
Port Arthur Sea Hawks players
Shreveport Sports players
Tulsa Oilers (baseball) players
Tyler East Texans players
Tyler Trojans players